Rashid Ṭalia (1877 – 17 September 1926) was a Jordanian politician of Lebanese Druze descent. He was the 1st Prime Minister of Transjordan from April 11, 1921 to August 5, 1921.

See also 
 List of prime ministers of Jordan

References

External links
 Prime Ministry of Jordan website

1877 births
1926 deaths
Prime Ministers of Jordan
Lebanese emigrants to Jordan
Jordanian people of Lebanese descent
Jordanian Druze